The Canal & River Trust (CRT), branded as  in Wales, holds the guardianship of 2,000 miles of canals and rivers, together with reservoirs and a wide range of heritage buildings and structures, in England and Wales. Launched on 12 July 2012, the Trust took over the responsibilities of the state-owned British Waterways in those two places.

History
The concept of a National Waterways Conservancy was first championed and articulated in the 1960s by Robert Aickman, the co-founder of the Inland Waterways Association, as a way to secure the future of Britain's threatened inland waterways network.

The idea was revived by the management of British Waterways in 2008 in response to increasing cuts in grant-in-aid funding, a drop in commercial income after the financial crisis of 2007–2008 and growing calls by waterway users for a greater say in the running of the waterways.

On 18 May 2009, launching 'Twenty Twenty – a vision for the future of our canals and rivers' on the terrace of the House of Commons, British Waterways proposed a radical overhaul of waterway management and a transfer from public corporation to not-for-profit organisation.  The event was supported by speakers from each of the three main parties: Charlotte Atkins MP, Peter Ainsworth MP and Lembit Opik MP.  British Waterways chairman, Tony Hales said: "The private sector built the canals, the public sector rescued them and I believe the third sector can be their future".

In November 2009, British Waterways published another paper 'Setting a New Course: Britain's Inland Waterways in the Third Sector'. This promoted the original suggestion by British Waterways, that it should become a private company, inheriting all of the property and other waterway assets held in public ownership by British Waterways.

On 24 March 2010, the Labour government announced its decision to mutualise British Waterways, a commitment which was repeated in Labour's 2010 manifesto: "To give more people a stake in a highly valued national asset, British Waterways will be turned into a mutually owned co-operative".

Following the 2010 general election, the incoming coalition government reaffirmed its support for status change on the waterways, as an example of the Conservative Party's commitment to the so-called Big Society.  Waterways Minister Richard Benyon MP stated on 21 June 2010 the government's "intention to move British Waterways to the civil society, subject to the outcome of the spending review."

Between March and June 2011, Defra ran a public consultation 'A New Era for the Waterways' on the overall structure of the proposed new body, the potential inclusion of the river navigations under the management of the Environment Agency (another public body), and the abolition of the Inland Waterways Advisory Council.

In October 2011, British Waterways announced a name and logo for a charitable trust which would inherit its English and Welsh operations: the Canal & River Trust, branded in Wales as Glandŵr Cymru (meaning Waterside Wales) — the Canal & River Trust in Wales. The Trust received charitable status in April and received parliamentary approval in June.

In July 2012, all British Waterways' assets, liabilities and responsibilities in England and Wales were transferred to the Canal & River Trust, which was launched officially on 12 July. At the same time, the Canal & River Trust merged with the English and Welsh operations of The Waterways Trust, a charity previously affiliated to British Waterways, to avoid confusion and as both charities had similar aims.

BWML, a private company limited by guarantee, was formerly owned by the Canal & River Trust and managed some 20 marinas. It was sold in December 2018  and subsequently rebranded Aquavista.

Scotland
In Scotland, British Waterways continues to operate as a stand-alone public corporation under the trading name Scottish Canals.

Access to waterways and towpaths 

Waterways in the care of the Canal & River Trust are accessible for use by boats, canoeists, paddleboarders and other watercraft upon payment of an appropriate licence fee.

Walkers and cyclists can use the extensive network of towpaths that run alongside the canals and rivers without payment of a fee. Horses may not be ridden or walked on a towpath unless it has been formally designated as a bridleway. Access by motorbikes and other motorised vehicles is not permitted.

Structure
The trust is headed by a board of 10 appointed and unelected trustees with a chairman, which is legally responsible for overseeing the work towards the Trust's charitable objectives and sets strategy for the trust. The trust has a 28-member council which referees the business of the trust and whose construction reflects the range of waterway users, from boating and angling through to walking and conservation. Finally, an executive team and six regional directors are collectively concerned with the ordinary running of the trust.

Council
The Canal & River Trust has a governing council of 28 members. Members of the first council included a mix of nominated and elected individuals. Council advises on shaping policy, raising and debating issues, providing guidance, perspective and a sounding board for the trustees.

Partnerships
For each of the trust's waterway areas there is a regional partnership drawn from local communities. In addition an all-Wales partnership considers issues relating to Welsh waterways and a separate partnership exists for the trust's museums and attractions.

Trustees
The trustees are legally responsible for ensuring that the trust meets its charitable objectives. Trustees are the unpaid board directors of the trust, taking collective decisions on policy and overarching strategy and providing oversight of the executive directors.

Management
Executive directors manage the everyday operation of the trust and develop policy and strategy for approval by the trustees.

Committees
The trust is supported through a number of advisory committees covering a range of different areas from freight and navigation to volunteering and heritage. These groups provide advice direct to the management of the trust.

The trust's head office is in Milton Keynes. It operates 11 local offices that deal with the general maintenance of the waterways in their area. These offices are based on the Waterways Partnership regions which are:

East Midlands region, based at Newark, Nottinghamshire
Kennet & Avon region, based in Devizes, Wiltshire
London
Manchester and Pennine region, based in Stoke-on-Trent; Stalybridge, Greater Manchester and Huddersfield, West Yorkshire
North East region, based in Leeds
North Wales and Borders region, based at Northwich, Cheshire
North West region, based at Wigan, Greater Manchester and at Bradford, West Yorkshire
South East region, based at Milton Keynes and at Braunston, Northamptonshire
South Wales and Severn region, based in Gloucester
West Midlands region, based at Fazeley and in Birmingham

Finance
The Trust receives a fixed grant from the Department for the Environment, Food and Rural Affairs over the 15 years commencing 2012. Its major other sources of income are from utilities (including fibre optic data connections and water sales) and property rentals from a £500 million property endowment granted by the government.  It also receives an income from issuing licences for boats using and mooring on the waterways; this is one of the largest income streams that Canal and River Trust Limited has, after the government grant and has been given a funding pledge by the People's Postcode Lottery of over £1 million.

Supporters and corporate partners
The Prince of Wales is the patron of the Canal & River Trust and the actor Brian Blessed supports the trust's volunteer appeal.

In June 2012 the trust announced three major corporate partners to support the Canal & River Trust:
Google partnered with the Canal & River Trust to include the UK's towpaths on Google Maps. This includes highlighting access points, bridges, locks and tunnels. Once the project is complete, members of the public will have the ability to plan journeys that include canal and river towpaths as well as roads.
The People's Postcode Lottery pledged to support the Canal & River Trust with £1m of funding. The charity lottery promised to support the restoration and conservation work of the Canal & River Trust over the next decade through the Postcode Green Trust.
The Co-operative Bank and the Canal & River Trust work together to provide financial products that allow people to support the work of the Trust.

Waterways operated
The Canal & River Trust is the owner or navigation authority for over 2,000 miles of waterways. These are:

Aire and Calder Navigation
Wakefield Branch
Ashby Canal
Ashton Canal
Birmingham Canal Navigations
Old and New Main Lines
Birmingham and Fazeley Canal
Dudley Canals No. 1 and 2
Rushall Canal
Tame Valley Canal
Titford Canal
Walsall Canal
Wednesbury Oak Loop
Wednesbury Old Canal
Wyrley and Essington Canal
Anglesey Branch
Cannock Extension Canal
Daw End Branch
Bow Back Rivers
Bridgwater and Taunton Canal
Calder and Hebble Navigation
Caldon Canal
Chesterfield Canal
Coventry Canal
Droitwich Canal
Erewash Canal
Fossdyke
Gloucester and Sharpness Canal

Grand Union Canal
Aylesbury Arm
Old Grand Union/Leicester Line
Market Harborough Arm
Northampton Arm
Paddington Arm
Slough Arm
Welford Arm
Wendover Arm
Grantham Canal
Hertford Union Canal
Huddersfield Broad Canal
Huddersfield Narrow Canal
Kennet and Avon Canal
Lancaster Canal including the Glasson Branch
Lee Navigation
Leeds and Liverpool Canal
Leigh Branch
Liverpool Canal Link
Rufford Branch
Limehouse Cut
Llangollen Canal
London Docklands including West India Docks.
Macclesfield Canal
Manchester Bolton & Bury Canal
Monmouthshire and Brecon Canal
Montgomery Canal
Nottingham Canal
Oxford Canal
Peak Forest Canal
Pocklington Canal

Regent's Canal
Ribble Link
Ripon Canal
River Aire
River Ouse
River Severn Navigation
River Soar
River Stort
River Trent
River Witham
Rochdale Canal
Sankey Canal
Selby Canal
Sheffield and South Yorkshire Navigation
New Junction Canal
Sheffield Canal
Shropshire Union Canal
Middlewich Branch
Shrewsbury Canal
Staffordshire and Worcestershire Canal
Stainforth and Keadby Canal
Stourbridge Canal
Stratford-upon-Avon Canal
Swansea Canal
Tees Navigation
Trent and Mersey Canal
Ure Navigation
Weaver Navigation
Worcester and Birmingham Canal

Museums

The Canal & River Trust operates several museums and visitor attractions that relate to canals and waterways.

 National Waterways Museum, Ellesmere Port, Cheshire
 The Canal Museum, Stoke Bruerne, Northamptonshire
 Gloucester Waterways Museum, Gloucester
 Anderton Boat Lift, Anderton, Cheshire
 Standedge Tunnel & Visitor Centre, Marsden, West Yorkshire

Controversies
In December 2016, Private Eye magazine reported that the Canal & River Trust had seized a historic retired lightship which had been moored for ten years at the docks near the maritime museum in Liverpool, following a dispute over unpaid berthing fees. The ship, named Planet, had served as the country's last manned lightship until 1989, when it went to a museum and later to Liverpool's docks, where it was restored and used as a cafe and volunteer-operated maritime radio museum. The ship's owner reportedly owed overdue berthing fees, which were subsequently paid but not before the trust had towed and impounded the boat in Sharpness, Gloucestershire, thereby incurring further hefty fees. The Merseyside Civic Society launched a petition to bring the vessel back to Liverpool but the trust later sold it for £12,500, less than its estimated scrap valuation of £70,000. The trust faced possible legal action over the seizure and sale of the ship.

In November 2019, the Trust was criticised for not acting on calls to open a sluice gate in Worksop during extensive flooding in the area. The gate was eventually opened by the fire service, several hours after the first request to the Trust. The gate is within a building (not owned by the Trust) which the Trust considered to be unsafe.

In January 2020, the Trust was criticised for not allowing a 200-year-old barge business to transport bulk-goods from Hull to Knostrop wharf, Leeds, despite the agreement of Leeds City Council and the fact that each shipment would remove 17 HGV journeys from the road network. By March 2020 the Trust had relented which should now allow the transport of bulk-goods from Hull to offload in Leeds.

See also

Canals of the United Kingdom
Scottish Canals
Environment Agency

References

External links

Waterways organisations in the United Kingdom
Charities based in Buckinghamshire
Private companies limited by guarantee of the United Kingdom
Inland waterway authorities
Transport charities based in the United Kingdom
Organisations based in Milton Keynes